Mutsuhiko (written:  or ) is a masculine Japanese given name. Notable people with the name include:

, Japanese speed skater
, Japanese footballer and manager

Japanese masculine given names